The Municipality of Bistrica ob Sotli is a municipality in eastern Slovenia. It has been an independent municipality since 1999; before, it was part of the Municipality of Podčetrtek. The seat of the municipality is the town of Bistrica ob Sotli. The area belongs to the traditional region of Styria. It is now included in the Lower Sava Statistical Region; until January 2014, it was part of the Savinja Statistical Region.

Settlements
In addition to the municipal seat of Bistrica ob Sotli, the municipality also includes the following settlements:

 Črešnjevec ob Bistrici
 Dekmanca
 Hrastje ob Bistrici
 Križan Vrh
 Kunšperk
 Ples
 Polje pri Bistrici
 Srebrnik
 Trebče
 Zagaj

Demographics
Population by native language, 2002 Census

References

External links

 Municipality of Bistrica ob Sotli on Geopedia
 Bistrica ob Sotli municipal website

Bistrica ob Sotli
1999 establishments in Slovenia